The Gjilan City Stadium is a football stadium in Gjilan, Kosovo. It is currently used mostly for football matches and is the home ground of SC Gjilani and FC Drita of the Football Superleague of Kosovo. The stadium was completed in 1967 but since 2017 is in Re-Construction project. The stadium holds less than 15,000 people.

Name

Fans of the two clubs of the city of Gjilan. The Intellectuals of FC Drita and Skifterat of SC Gjilani, have named the stadium of the city according to their wishes. Intellectuals have stressed that the stadium has the name of Selami Osmani - Bezi, while Skifterat named Agim Ramadani. But officially the stadium is called "Gjilan City Stadium".

Re-construction
As of 23 April 2017 re-construction of the Gjilan City Stadium has started. This project is foreseen to be completed after three years and will have a capacity of 15,000 seats. The stadium is designed as the fourth category according to UEFA regulations. The reconstruction value of the stadium is 6 million euros.

The stadium will be completely destroyed by the tribunes in the lounge area, as well as major repairs like water supply, sewage. Tribunes will be built even after the gates, while a part of the stands will be covered. There will be reflectors and the stadium will be foreseen to have about 10,000 seats. Each officially delegated person will have his seat such as: journalists, cameramen, handicapped persons, special guests and so on.

Notes and references
Notes:

References:

External links
Stadium information

Gjilan
FC Drita
SC Gjilani